Seagroves Farm Park is a public, urban park in Apex, North Carolina. It is located at 201 Parkfield Drive, approximately one and a half miles east of the Apex Historic District.

The park has a pond with fishing pier, shelter, playground, and walking trail. It also contains a large open play field.

References

Apex, North Carolina
Urban public parks
Parks in Wake County, North Carolina
Tourist attractions in Apex, North Carolina